Togiak Wilderness is a federally designated wilderness area in the Dillingham and Bethel Census Areas in the southwestern part of the U.S. state of Alaska.  At , it occupies the northern half of the Togiak National Wildlife Refuge.  It protects pristine rivers, lakes, and steep-sloped mountains, including the rugged Ahklun Mountains and Wood River Range, which are located partly within the wilderness.  Parts of the Kanektok, Goodnews, and Togiak drainages are also located within the boundaries of the Togiak Wilderness.

See also
 List of U.S. Wilderness Areas
 Wilderness Act

References

External links
 Togiak Wilderness - Wilderness.net
 Togiak National Wildlife Refuge - U.S. Fish & Wildlife Service

Protected areas of Bethel Census Area, Alaska
Protected areas of Dillingham Census Area, Alaska
Wilderness areas of Alaska